Amidaus Professionals Football Club is a football club from Ghana based in Tema, Greater Accra Region. The club are competing in the Glo Premier League. It qualified to partake in their maiden premiership campaign during the 2012-2013 Glo Premier League and was coached by Tony Lokko. After the campaign, Lokko announced his departure from the club. In July 2013, the club announced that it was going to appoint Fetteh Feyenoord trainer Baba Ali as their new coach.

External links
Amidaus Professionals logo

References

Football clubs in Ghana
2006 establishments in Ghana
Association football clubs established in 2006
Sports clubs in Ghana
Tema